Self-conscious emotions, such as guilt, shame, embarrassment, and pride, are a variety of social emotions that relate to our sense of self and our consciousness of others' reactions to us.

Description 

During the second year of life, new emotions begin to emerge when children gain the understanding that they themselves are entities distinct from other people and begin to develop a sense of self. These emotions include:
 Shame
 Pride
 Guilt
 Envy
 Embarrassment

Self-conscious emotions have been shown to have social benefits. These include areas such as reinforcing social behaviors and reparation of social errors. There is also possible research suggesting that a lack of self-conscious emotion is a contributing cause of bad behaviour.

They have five distinct features that differentiate them from other emotions:
Require self-awareness and self representation
Emerge later than basic emotions
Facilitate attainment of complex social goals
Do not have distinct universally recognized facial expressions
Cognitively complex

Development

Self-conscious emotions are among the latter of emotions to develop. Two reasons are at the cause of this:

Body language

Emotions such as joy, fear and sadness can all be gathered reliantly on just a person’s face. However self-conscious emotions heavily involve the body in addition to the face (Darwin, 1965). This means that when humans are attempting to learn self-conscious emotions, they have more to tend to, making the emotions harder to grasp.

Self-awareness

Due to the nature of these emotions, they can only begin to form once an individual has the capacity to self-evaluate their own actions. If the individual decides that they have caused a situation to occur, they then must decide if the situation was a success or a failure based on the social norms they have accrued, then attach the appropriate self-conscious feeling (Weiner, 1986). This is a complex cognitive skill, one that takes time to master.

Biological complexity

As stated, self-conscious emotions are  complex and harder to learn than basic emotions such as happiness or fear. This premise also has biological backing.

Frontotemporal lobar degeneration

Frontotemporal lobar degeneration (FTLD) is a neurodegenerative disease that attacks the brain selectively in the frontal lobe, temporal lobe and amygdala. Patients suffering from FTLD offer information on the biological complexity involved in generating self-conscious emotions. With the use of a startle experiment (where patients and control participants are exposed to an unexpected and loud sound) it has been shown that sufferers of FTLD show and experience the basic negative emotions expected to be attached to the startling sounds. However they show significantly less signs of experiencing self-conscious emotions compared to control groups. This is due to an inhibition of embarrassment caused by the damaged brain (Sturm & Rosen, 2006).

The ability to show basic emotions while lacking the ability to perform the more complex self-conscious emotions demonstrates that self-conscious emotions are biologically harder to perform than average emotions. FTLD patients tend to struggle in social situations (Sturm & Rosen, 2006). This is again linked with their inability to perform self-conscious emotions adequately.

Social benefits

Acquiring the ability to perform self-conscious emotions may be relatively difficult, but does bring benefits. The main benefits being those of social harmony and social healing.

Social harmony

Self-conscious emotions are seen to promote social harmony in different ways. The first is its ability to reinforce social norms. It does this in a very similar way to that of operant conditioning. Performing well in situations while keeping to social norms can elicit pride. This feels good so therefore encourages the behaviour to be repeated. Equally performing in a situation while not sticking to the social norms can leave individuals feeling embarrassed. This feels bad and is generally avoided in the future. An example of this is a study (Brown, 1970) where participants were shown to choose avoiding feelings of embarrassment over financial gains.

Social healing

Self-conscious emotions enable social healing. When an individual makes a social error, feelings of guilt or embarrassment changes not just the person’s mood but their body language. In this situation the individual gives out non-verbal signs of submission and this is generally more likely to be greeted with forgiveness. This has been shown in a study where actors knocked over a supermarket shelve (Semin & Manstead, 1982). Those that acted embarrassed were received more favorably than those who reacted in a neutral fashion.

Levels of embarrassment have found to be easier to see in females and African-Americans, than compared to male and Caucasian targets (Keltner, 1995). This is due to social learnings from previous generations.

Poor behaviour

Initially, self-conscious emotions were looked upon as troublesome and all part of an internal fight. However, views on this have now changed. There is a strong link between the ability of an individual to regulate their behaviour in an appropriate manner and problems with their self-conscious emotions. A school was able to list a set of boys who were classified as ‘prone to aggression and delinquent behaviour’. When these boys sat an interactive IQ test, they scored higher on scores of anger compared with the normal boys at the school. They also scored lower in feelings of embarrassment (Keltner, 1995).

Caution should be taken with regards to these studies. While the findings are becoming more robust, the number of different variables involved will make it hard to ever come to a conclusion on the subject of poor behaviour being caused by these deficiencies. The difficulty being the hardship of creating the proper environment within a lab where self-conscious emotions would not only occur, but could be adequately measured.

See also
 Attention
 Developmental psychology
 Moral emotions
 Psychological repression
 Self-consciousness
 Self-esteem
 Self-pity
 Thought suppression

References
 Brown, B. R. (1970). Face-saving following experimentally induced embarrassment. Journal of Experimental Social Psychology, 4, 107–122.
 Darwin, C., R. (1965). The expression of the emotions in man and animals. Chicago: University of Chicago Press. (Original work publish 1872).
 Keltner, D. (1995). Signs of appeasement: Evidence for the distinct displaysof embarrassment, amusement, and shame. Journal of Personalityand Social Psychology, 68, 441–454.
 Semin, G. R., & Manstead, A. S. R. (1982). The social implications of embarrassment displays and restitution behavior. European Journal of Social Psychology, 12, 367–377.
 Sturm, V., E. & Rosen, H., J. (2006). Self-conscious emotion deficits in frontotemporal lobar degeneration. Retrieve from the web, 11th Jan 2010. http://brain.oxfordjournals.org/cgi/content/full/129/9/2508
 Weiner, B. (1986). An atrributional theory of motivation and emotion. New York: Springer-Verlag.
Tracy, J. L., & Robins, R. W. (2004). Keeping the self in self-conscious emotions: Further arguments for a theoretical model. Psychological Inquiry, 15(2), 171-177.

Emotion